Elkenroth is a municipality that lies on the boundary of the Westerwald region in the district of Altenkirchen, Rhineland-Palatinate, Germany. It belongs to the Verbandsgemeinde of Betzdorf-Gebhardshain.

References

External links
 Homepage of Elkenroth
 Chronicle
 Homepage of Verbandsgemeinde Gebhardshain

Altenkirchen (district)